Old Prairie Branch is a stream in Washington County in the U.S. state of Missouri. It is a tributary of Old Mines Creek.

Old Prairie Branch took its name from a prairie of the same name near its course. The namesake prairie itself is gone, and the location of it unknown to the GNIS.

See also
List of rivers of Missouri

References

Rivers of Washington County, Missouri
Rivers of Missouri